Peter Gumbsch (born 21 January 1962 in Pforzheim, Germany) is a German physicist and materials scientist. He is the director of the Fraunhofer-Institut für Werkstoffmechanik IWM, (Fraunhofer Institute for Mechanics of Materials IWM) in Freiburg, Germany and professor for mechanics of materials at the Karlsruhe Institute of Technology (KIT).

Gumbsch was elected a member of the National Academy of Engineering in 2016 for multi-scaled modelling techniques that improve fracture and deformation behavior of structural materials.

Biography
Peter Gumbsch received his degree in physics (1988) and his doctoral degree (1991) from the University of Stuttgart.
After extended visits at the Sandia National Laboratories in Livermore, California, postdoctoral work at the Imperial College, London and the University of Oxford, he returned to the Max-Planck-Institute in Stuttgart as a group leader and established the group “Modeling and Simulation of Thin Film Phenomena”. In 2001 he took the chair for Mechanics of Materials at the Karlsruhe Institute of Technology KIT and the position as head of Fraunhofer Institute for Mechanics of Materials IWM in Freiburg.

Research
Peter Gumbsch is a German materials scientist working in the field of mechanics of materials on questions concerning materials behavior under load. The focus is on a better understanding of the behavior of materials, components and systems at the limits of their load bearing capacity. His aim is safety and reliability in the use of materials and components, as well as the improvement of material and energy efficiency in technical systems.

Peter Gumbsch investigates materials, their internal structure and their properties. His research is directed towards the understanding and the mathematical modeling of deformation and fracture processes with the aim of making materials and components safer, more reliable and more durable. His concepts of multiscale materials modeling, which link mechanisms at the nano, micro and macro scales are internationally recognized. He and his team are pioneering the integration of materials data and materials modeling into the product development process. His current interests are directed towards the investigation of friction and wear processes, where complex interactions of mechanics, physics and chemistry are important.

Awards and honors
 2019 Member of the National Academy of Science and Engineering acatech
 2016 Member of the US National Academy of Engineering (NAE), USA
 2013 DGM Prize, German Society for Material Science
 2009 Hector Science Award
 2008 Member of the German Academy of Sciences Leopoldina – National Academy of Science, Germany
 2007 Gottfried Wilhelm Leibniz Prize, German Research Foundation
 1998 FEMS Lecturer, Federation of European Materials Societies
 1998 Masing Memorial Prize, German Society for Material Science
 1997 Peter Haasen Prize, Institute of Metal Physics, Universität Göttingen in association with the Peter Haasen Foundation
 1992 Otto Hahn Medal, Max Planck Society

References

External links 
 Vita Peter Gumbsch
 Fraunhofer Institute for Mechanics of Materials IWM
 Peter Gumbsch: Fraunhofer Institute for Mechanics of Materials IWM Publications
 Peter Gumbsch: Publications
 Institute for Applied Materials Computational materials Science IAM-CMS

1962 births
Living people
21st-century German physicists
German materials scientists
Academic staff of the Karlsruhe Institute of Technology
University of Stuttgart alumni
Gottfried Wilhelm Leibniz Prize winners
Max Planck Institutes researchers